Saulcy may refer to:

Saulcy, Switzerland, a municipality in the canton of Jura, Switzerland
Saulcy, Aube, a commune in the Aube department, France
Saulcy-sur-Meurthe, a commune in the Vosges department, France